Flashback is the fifth single album by South Korean girl group After School. The maxi-single marks the first appearance of fifth generation member, Kaeun. This also marks the first comeback since Kahi's official graduation from the group to pursue a solo career.

Background
On 9 April 2012, Pledis revealed that a brand new member would be added to the group. The following day, the member was officially revealed to be Kaeun and details regarding a Korean comeback in June were revealed.

On 11 June 2012, the first teaser image, featuring all eight members, for the comeback was released to the public via Pledis Entertainment's website. Later that day the title of the maxi-single was revealed, "Flashback", along with the track list. 
The following day, a second teaser picture was released featuring third generation member Lizzy. The photo showed that the group are returning to their sexy concept as Lizzy was seen wearing black mesh clothing and was in a seductive, sultry pose which is similar to the concept the group had when they debuted. A day after Lizzy's teaser photo, Uie's photo was revealed, followed by Nana & Raina, Jungah, Juyeon, and lastly E-Young & Kaeun. Although it was speculated that Nana would become the leader, Pledis announced the empty leader position with the graduation of Kahi will be taken on by Jungah.

Critical reception
Flashback received generally positive feedback worldwide. Embrace You magazine described the maxi single as "creative, fun, exciting, well organized, and demonstrates brilliant production efforts. There are no fillers or musically incorrect additions; each track has the potential to stand on its own and appeal to not only pop and dance fans, but to lovers of ballads and R&B." The American-based webzine gave "Flashback" a rating of 5 out of 5 for perfection.

"Flashback", was the fourth most played song on Korean broadcast and radio charts according to Air Monitor, a website that monitors and calculates song airplays from 23 different radio stations in Korea. The song managed to beat tough competition from Super Junior, 2NE1 and Sistar. In addition, "Flashback" ranked number six on Billboards Top 20 K-Pop Songs of 2012.

Track listing

Chart performance
The title track, "Flashback", was downloaded 202,940 times in South Korea after 2 days of its release. In July 2012, the song was downloaded 414,825 times, after being downloaded 363,875 times in June 2012, and rose to #26 on the Gaon Monthly Download Chart. The song has since been downloaded over 1 million times. "Flashback" debuted at #15 on the Gaon Weekly Singles Chart and peaked at #14 the following week. The maxi-single debuted at #3 on the Gaon Weekly Album Chart selling 14,197 copies. As of the end of 2012, the maxi-single has sold 16,885 copies in South Korea.

Single chart

Other songs charted

Album chart

Sales

Release history

Credits and personnel 
Jungah – main vocals
Jooyeon – vocals, background vocal
Uee – vocals, background vocal
Raina – main vocals, background vocal
Nana – lead vocals, rap, background vocal
Lizzy – lead vocals, rap, background vocal
E-young – vocals, background vocal
Kaeun – vocals, background vocal

References

2012 albums
After School (band) albums
Single albums
Hybe Corporation albums